Paul P. J. Cooper (born 13 January 1928) was a Hong Kong sailor. He competed at the 1964 Summer Olympics and the 1968 Summer Olympics.

References

External links
 

1928 births
Possibly living people
Hong Kong male sailors (sport)
Olympic sailors of Hong Kong
Sailors at the 1964 Summer Olympics – Dragon
Sailors at the 1968 Summer Olympics – Dragon
Place of birth missing (living people)